Fihaonana  is a town in Analamanga Region, in the  Central Highlands of Madagascar, located north at 60 km from the capital of Antananarivo, 5 km off from the highway RN 4 to Mahajunga.

The commune is composed by 16 villages (fonkontany):

Andriatsibibiarivony, Tsitakondaza, Manankasina, Lovasoa, Manantenasoa, Tsaramivondrona, Tsimialona, Tsimiamboholahy, Fihaonana, Masindray-Est, Fokotsambo, Sambatra, Madiokororoka, Antsapanimahazo, Ambohimpiainana, Andranovelona, Andranofotsifandrosoana, Ambohitraina.

References

Populated places in Analamanga